The Douglas O-46 was an observation aircraft used by the United States Army Air Corps and the Philippine Army Air Corps.

Design and development
The O-46A, the last of a long line of Douglas observation aircraft, was a victim of progress. It was designed to operate from established airfields behind fairly static battle lines as in World War I. However, in 1939, a report was issued on the O-46A which stated that it was too slow and heavy to outrun and outmaneuver enemy fighter aircraft, too heavy to operate from small, wet, unprepared fields, and too large to conceal beneath trees. This report was a forecast of the future, for World War II with its rapidly changing battle lines proved the need for light, maneuverable observation aircraft which could operate from unimproved airstrips. Consequently, in 1942, the "O" (observation) designation was changed to "L" (liaison).

The O-46 was a development of the earlier Douglas O-43. The 24th airframe of the O-43A contract was completed as the XO-46 prototype, with a revised wing and an engine switch, from the O-43's inline engine to a radial engine, the Pratt & Whitney R-1535-7. The Air Corps ordered 90 O-46As in 1935. They were built between May 1936 and April 1937.

Operational history
At least 11 O-46s saw overseas duty; two were destroyed in the Japanese raid on Clark Field in the Philippines on 8 December 1941. The Maryland Air National Guard operated O-46As off the coast of New Jersey for anti-submarine duty. The remainder were declared obsolete in late 1942 and after that were used primarily in training and utility roles.

A proposed variant with a Wright R-1670-3 engine received the designation O-48 but was not built.

Surviving aircraft
The only surviving O-46A (s/n 35-179) is currently in storage in the collection of the National Museum of the United States Air Force at Wright-Patterson AFB near Dayton, Ohio. On 27 November 1942, the aircraft was part of the 81st Air Base Squadron, when it landed downwind at Brooks Field, Harlingen, Texas, ran out of runway and overturned. Written off, it was abandoned in place. More than 20 years later it was discovered by the Antique Airplane Association with trees growing through its wings, and in 1967, it was rescued and hauled to Ottumwa, Iowa. Restoration turned out to be beyond the organization's capability, and in September 1970, it was traded to the National Museum of the United States Air Force for a flyable Douglas C-47 Skytrain. The (then) Air Force Museum had it restored at Purdue University, and placed it on display in 1974, the sole survivor of the 91 O-46s built.

Specifications (O-46A)

See also

References

Notes

Bibliography

 Armstrong, William M. Baltimore in World War II. Mount Pleasant, South Carolina: Arcadia Publishing, 2005. .
 Francillon, René J. McDonnell Douglas Aircraft since 1920. London: Putnam, 1979. .

External links

 Douglas O-46 at Ugolok Neba (in Russian, with drawings and photos)

Douglas O-46
Douglas O-46
Parasol-wing aircraft
O-46
Single-engined tractor aircraft
Aircraft first flown in 1935